Bjarni Benediktsson (born 26 January 1970), known colloquially as Bjarni Ben, is an Icelandic politician, who served as prime minister of Iceland from January to November 2017. He has been the leader of the Icelandic Independence Party since 2009, and served as Minister of Finance and Economic Affairs from 2013 to 2017, a post he later retained under Katrín Jakobsdóttir.

Early life and education
Bjarni was born in Reykjavík. His great uncle was the former prime minister of Iceland of the same name, Bjarni Benediktsson.

After obtaining a law degree at the University of Iceland, Bjarni went on to learn German and law at the Goethe-Institut and University of Freiburg respectively in Germany from 1995 to 1996. In the following year he would attend the University of Miami in the United States, where he earned a LL.M. degree. He then returned to  Iceland, working as an attorney.

Political career
Bjarni entered the national parliament in 2003 and has been active in several committees in the areas of economy and taxation, industry and foreign affairs.

Bjarni was elected leader of the conservative Independence Party at its national convention on 29 March 2009 with 58.1 percent of the vote, about a month before the April 2009 Icelandic legislative elections. The party came in second in the elections with 16 seats, nine fewer than in the previous elections. After conceding defeat on 26 April 2009, Bjarni said his party had lost the trust of voters. "We lost this time but we will win again later," he said.

In the 2013 Althing elections on 28 April the Independence Party and their ally the Progressive Party each won 19 seats. On 17 May 2013 Icelandic media reported that Bjarni would take up the position of Minister of Finance and Economic Affairs in a cabinet led by Progressive Party leader Sigmundur Davíð Gunnlaugsson. In the 2016 Althing elections, the Independence Party won 21 seats, while the Progressive party only won 8. Shortly after the results, Prime Minister Sigurður Ingi Jóhannsson resigned from his post. A new coalition between the Independence Party, the Reform Party and Bright Future was formed in January 2017 with Bjarni designated to become Prime Minister.

Controversies

Ashley Madison 
In 2015, it was revealed that Bjarni had registered on Ashley Madison, a website for extramarital affairs. In response, Bjarni and his wife said that they had both registered on the site because they were curious. His username was "IceHot1".

Panama Papers 
As reported in 2016, Bjarni "shared what is known as 'power of attorney' over a shell company" involved in the Panama Papers.

Bjarni came under criticism in January 2017 for not revealing a government report on the offshore bank activities of Icelanders before the 2016 parliamentary elections. Bjarni falsely told reporters that he had not seen the report prior to the elections. He later apologized for his "inaccurate timeline".

Breach of COVID-19 rules 
Shortly before midnight on 23 December 2020, police in Reykjavík dissolved a gathering of 40-50 people at the art gallery Ásmundarsalur for breach of COVID-19 restrictions. Police report stated that a senior minister in the government had been present, later revealed to be Bjarni. At the time, COVID-19 restrictions limited gatherings in Iceland to ten people. The venue, which sells alcoholic beverages, was also not allowed to be open after 10 pm.

Bjarni claimed that he had visited the exhibition with his wife to greet their friends and that he was only present for 15 minutes during which the number of guests increased. "The right reaction would have been to leave the gallery as soon as I realized that the number of people exceeded the limit. I didn't do that and I apologise for that mistake" he said in a statement posted on Facebook. According to a source of the newspaper Vísir, Bjarni was however present for at least 45 minutes.

Chief epidemiologist Þórólfur Guðnason said that Bjarni's actions set a "bad example" and he did not expect the public to perceive it well. Furthermore, he said the gathering had been a clear violation of COVID-19 restrictions.

Prime Minister (2017)

Bjarni became Prime Minister of Iceland on 11 January 2017. In September 2017, the future of the Icelandic government and Bjarni's tenure as prime minister was put in doubt when the Bright Future party withdrew from the governing coalition. Bright Future did this in the wake of reporting that government ministers of the Independence Party had concealed that Bjarni's father, Benedikt Sveinsson, recommended that the criminal record of convicted child sex offender Hjalti Sigurjón Hauksson be erased.

The Minister of Justice, Sigríður Andersen, had informed Bjarni about his father's involvement in the letter of recommendation in July, and refused to disclose the recommendation's author until compelled to by a parliamentary committee.

Finance Minister (2017–present)
After the 2017 parliamentary elections, Katrín Jakobsdóttir became prime minister, and in a coalition agreement, Bjarni became the finance minister again.

References

External links

Ministry of Finance and Economic Affairs > Minister (Icelandic)
Government Offices of Iceland > Present Government of Iceland (Icelandic)

|-

|-

|-

Living people
1970 births
Bjarni Benediktsson
Bjarni Benediktsson
Bjarni Benediktsson
Bjarni Benediktsson
Bjarni Benediktsson
People named in the Panama Papers
Bjarni Benediktsson
University of Miami alumni